William Herbert McVeigh (17 December 1881 – 22 November 1951) was an Australian rules footballer who played with Carlton in the Victorian Football League (VFL).

Notes

External links 

Bill McVeigh's profile at Blueseum

1881 births
1951 deaths
Australian rules footballers from Victoria (Australia)
Carlton Football Club players
West Melbourne Football Club players